is a 2017 Japanese film on kadō directed by Tetsuo Shinohara.

Plot

Cast
 Mansai Nomura as Ikenobō Senkō
 Ichikawa En'nosuke IV as Toyotomi Hideyoshi
 Kōichi Satō as Sen no Rikyū
 Kiichi Nakai as Oda Nobunaga
 Kuranosuke Sasaki as Maeda Toshiie
 Katsumi Takahashi
 Takaya Yamauchi
 Masato Wada
 Aoi Morikawa as Ren
 Eisaku Yoshida as Ishida Mitsunari
 Keiko Takeshita as Jōchin'ni

Awards

References

External links
  
 

2017 films
Films set in Kyoto
Japanese drama films
Ikebana
Toei Company films
Films directed by Tetsuo Shinohara
2010s Japanese films
2010s Japanese-language films